The Martyrs of Mboktwana were seven Christian men massacred in 1880.

The massacre 
The story of the massacre is described by Mr R. Stewart, of the Kaffrarian Mission as follows:

Callaway describes how Bransby Key, bishop of St John's understood that the massacre was an attack on Christians rather than on a racial or tribal group (the Fingoes).

Commemoration 

The Anglican Church of Southern Africa commemorates The Martyrs of Mboktwana in its Calendar of saints on the 3rd day of November each year.  In addition the collect for this commemoration is as follows:

Notes and references 

 
 
 

19th-century Christian martyrs